Jack Lorraine Skinner (11 August 1915 – 3 January 2002) was a football (soccer) player who represented New Zealand at international level.

Skinner made two appearances in official internationals for the All Whites, scoring New Zealand's goal in a 1–7 loss to Australia on 4 July 1936, while his second match, losing 0–10 to Australia on 11 July 1936, still stands as New Zealand's biggest loss in official matches, although New Zealand have been beaten by more in unofficial matches, notably England Amateurs in 1937 and Manchester United in 1967.

References

External links
Jack Skinner's profile at the New Zealand Death Index

1915 births
2002 deaths
New Zealand association footballers
New Zealand international footballers
Association footballers not categorized by position